Verrulactones are alternariol-derived antimicrobial chemical compounds isolated from Penicillium.

References

External links
ChemSpider - Verrulactone A

Penicillium
Resorcinols
Antimicrobials
Benzochromenes